Khamitovo (Xämit) is a rural locality (a selo) and the administrative center of Khamitovsky Selsoviet, Abzelilovsky District, Bashkortostan, Russia. The population was 676 as of 2010. There are 12 streets.

Geography 
Khamitovo is located 75 km northwest of Askarovo (the district's administrative centre) by road. Maygashta is the nearest rural locality.

References 

Rural localities in Abzelilovsky District